Kraurogymnocarpa is a genus of fungi within the Gymnoascaceae family. This is a monotypic genus, containing the single species Kraurogymnocarpa lenticulispora.

References

External links
 Kraurogymnocarpa at Index Fungorum

Monotypic Eurotiomycetes genera
Onygenales